Langley Education Centre (LEC) is a public high school in Langley, British Columbia, part of School District 35 Langley.

LEC offers secondary school (Gr. 10–12) options for teens and adults to continue and complete a secondary education or upgrade their courses. The courses are offered one of two ways:

 Structured, semester and blended classes meeting once or twice a week in either the morning, afternoon or evening for two to three hour periods, providing flexibility for students as to when they attend. Registration happens at the beginning of each semester in August/September, and January/February.
 On-site and Online Directed Learning classes (Langley Online and Distributed Learning) that allow continuous intake throughout the year and allows students to work at their own pace. Students can either attend their tutorial session once a week to work with their teacher, or complete courses online, working in a web-based environment.

History 

Established in 1986, LEC was founded as an alternative secondary school located in commercial space at Sundel Square in the City of Langley, British Columbia (20216 Fraser Highway, Langley, BC). In November 2006, the Board of Education decided to move LEC from its original location to its new home on a shared campus with Langley Secondary School. The decision came as the Board of Education was facing budgetary constraints and underutilized facilities and LEC was facing increasingly inadequate and aging commercial space. The move was completed in February 2008 at a cost of $1.4 million. The new shared campus at Langley Secondary School provided LEC with a 900 square metre, state-of-the-art facility which includes eight classrooms: three shared with LSS, two located with the LEC office in the main building, and three in new modulars linked to the main building by covered walkways. In addition, a child minding facility on the premises.

Structured Courses

Semestered 

In a semestered class, students attend two classes per week for one semester (approx. 5 months)

Courses

Important Information Regarding Semester Classes at LEC
 Students must be at least 16 years old as of July 1, 2011 in order to qualify for semestered classes. Students under 16 may qualify if they are part of LEC CHOICES program. 
 Students may be registered and taking classes in other Langley schools and still enroll in LEC semestered classes. Students who are registered in school districts other than Langley may not be eligible for semestered classes.

Blended 

In a blended class, students attend one class per week for one semester (approx. 5 months). The remainder of the course is completed through online assignments or on-site directed learning.

Courses

Important Information Regarding Blended Classes at LEC
 Students in blended classes may also be registered in other schools or districts
 There is no age restriction for students registered in blended classes

On-site/Online Directed Learning

On-site Directed Learning 

The LEC Distributed Learning Program includes a variety of online and paper-based directed learning courses.

Registration for LEC DL courses occurs year-round (September - April). You have 2 semesters from the time of registration to complete your course (including the semester in which you register and the following semester).

Courses

Online Directed Learning 

LEC online, developed by the Langley Education Centre, delivers high school courses in an online environment. Registration for LEC online courses occurs year-round (late August- April 30). An online course can be completed at the student's own pace within a maximum of 2 consecutive semesters. Online course work is primarily completed at home with teacher support at LEC. Exams are written at LEC.

An added feature of LEC online courses, is the availability of its teachers. Along with regular online support and contact, teachers are also available at the Langley Education Centre for tutorial sessions. Online students are welcome to come in to get "in-person" help if needed.

Courses

Child Minding 

Langley Education Centre offers childcare for students with babies and children under the age of six years (space limited). In addition, LEC provides peer support, life-skills workshops, including topics: safety in the workplace, job interview skills, field trips and social events, and a weekly parenting group, co-sponsored by Aldergrove Neighbourhood Services

References

External links
 Official Site
 Profile on School District Site
 Growth Plan 2011-2012
 Code of Conduct
 Langley Education Centre School Blog

Social media
 Langley Education Centre News on Twitter
 Langley Education Centre Grad & Univ Info on Twitter
 Langley Education Centre on Facebook
  Langley Education Centre Grad Info on Facebook

School Reports - Ministry of Education
 Student Statistics
 Early Development Instrument
 Provincial Required Examinations
 Provincial Optional Examinations
 Graduation Rates

High schools in British Columbia
School District 35 Langley
Educational institutions established in 1986
1986 establishments in British Columbia